Cyclopteropsis popovi is a species of lumpfish native to the Northwest Pacific. It can be found from the Sea of Okhotsk to the Pacific coasts of the northern Kuril Islands. Some specimens of the related species C. brashnikowi suggest that the two might be synonymous (although sources such as FishBase still list them as two separate species), in which case C. brashnikowi would be considered the senior synonym.

References 

Fish described in 1929
Taxa named by Vladimir Soldatov
Fish of the North Pacific
popovi